The 2018–19 Alaska Nanooks men's ice hockey season was the 70th season of play for the program, the 35th at the Division I level and the 6th in the WCHA conference. The Nanooks represented the University of Alaska Fairbanks and were coached by Erik Largen, in his 1st season.

Season
After just one season with Lance West behind the bench, Alaska brought in Erik Largen as the program's 27th head coach. The Nanooks had trouble finding their game early in the season under their new leader and began 0–7–1. While some of the struggles were caused by a difficult schedule (6 games came against ranked opponents), Alaska's offense was paltry in those matches. The team averages less than 2 goals per game and were shut out on three occasions.

The team improved in November and saw some modest gains in their scoring production. Freshman goalie, Gustavs Dāvis Grigals, also got a turn in net and helped propel Alaska to four wins over a four-week span. While it looked like the team may be rounding a corner, both Grigals and nominal starter Anton Martinsson struggled as the calendar turned to January and the Nanooks ended up with a 5-game losing streak.

Martinsson recovered first and helped the team right the ship down the stretch. Alaska showed some grit with wins over Bowling Green and Minnesota State when both were ranked in the top-10. The Nanooks were also able to take three out of four games from Alaska Anchorage to claim their seventh straight Governor's Cup.

In the WCHA Tournament, Alaska continued to show improvement when they fought hard against 2nd seed, Northern Michigan. The team took a 4–2 lead into the third period but couldn't stop the Wildcats from tying the game in the waning seconds. The Nanooks fought hard in the overtime, firing 14 shots on goal in just over 30 minutes, but they couldn't solve Atte Tolvanen. While NMU won the game, the team didn't fold and continued to press in the second game. Alaska got out to a 2–0 lead by the midpoint of the game but again could not hold the lead and surrendered 4 goals over a 20-minute span. Tyler Cline scored with Martinsson on the bench to close the gap to 1 but the Nanooks couldn't get the tying marker and saw their season slip away despite a gutsy performance.

Departures

Recruiting

Roster

Standings

Schedule and results

|-
!colspan=12 style=";" | Exhibition

|-
!colspan=12 style=";" | Regular Season

|-
!colspan=12 style=";" | 

|- align="center" bgcolor="#e0e0e0"
|colspan=12|Alaska Lost Series 0–2

Scoring statistics

Goaltending statistics

Rankings

USCHO did not release a poll in Week 25.

Awards and honors

References

2018-19
Alaska
Alaska
Alaska
Alaska